William G. Tierney is an American scholar of higher education.  He earned a master’s degree from Harvard University and holds a Ph.D. from Stanford University in administration and policy analysis.  He has had Fulbright Fellowships Scholarships to Latin America and Australia.  He also was Scholar-in-Residence at Universiti Sains Malaysia.  Tierney served as president of the Association for the Study of Higher Education (ASHE) from 2001-2002 and as president of the American Educational Research Association (AERA) from 2012-2013.  He is currently University Professor, Wilbur-Kieffer Professor of Higher Education and Co-Director of the Pullias Center for Higher Education at the University of Southern California.

Tierney is the author of a self-published academic novel, Academic Affairs: A Love Story.

References

American educational theorists
Year of birth missing (living people)
Living people
Harvard University alumni
Stanford University alumni